Sherman Township is a township in Clay County, Kansas, USA.  As of the 2000 census, its population was 328.

Geography
According to the USGS, it contains two cemeteries: Morganville and Sherman.

Stillwater Lake is within this township. The streams of East Branch Dry Creek and Peats Creek run through this township.

References
 USGS Geographic Names Information System (GNIS)

External links
 US-Counties.com
 City-Data.com

Townships in Clay County, Kansas
Townships in Kansas